Kaniyeh Sar (also Romanized as Kānīyeh Sar and Kānīyyeh Sar) is a village in Marhemetabad Rural District, in the Central District of Miandoab County, West Azerbaijan Province, Iran.

History 
At the 2006 census, its population was 328, in 86 families.

References 

Populated places in Miandoab County